Tennis performance timeline comparison may refer to:

Tennis performance timeline comparison (men)
Tennis performance timeline comparison (women)
Tennis performance timeline comparison (women) (1884–1977)